MGE Energy: MGE Energy, Inc. (Nasdaq: MGEE) is a utility holding company based in Madison, Wisconsin. Its main subsidiary, Madison Gas and Electric Co., produces and distributes electricity and distributes natural gas.

Subsidiaries
MGE Energy is the parent corporation and holding company of eight subsidiaries.
Madison Gas and Electric Co. (MGE), a regulated utility, and its divisions, which serve natural gas and electric customers in south-central and south-western Wisconsin. MGE has 146,000 electric customers and 152,000 natural gas customers.
MGE Power, which owns assets in the West Campus Cogeneration Facility at Madison, Wis., and the Elm Road Generating Station at Oak Creek, Wis.
MGE Transco Investment, which owns interest in the American Transmission Co. through its members, MGE and MGE Energy
MGE Services provides construction and other services 
Central Wisconsin Development Corp. promotes business growth in MGE's service area
MAGAEL holds title to properties acquired for future utility plant expansion
North Mendota Energy & Technology Park owns property and serves as the development entity for the property

History
The company's history in the Madison area date back more than 150 years. In 1888, as the renamed Madison Electric Co., it began delivering electric service. In 1892, the Four Lakes Light and Power Co. succeeded Madison Electric Co. and operated as Madison's electricity provider for the next four years. In 1896, the local utility incorporated to become Madison Gas and Electric Co.

In 2001, the company formed a holding company named MGE Energy, Inc. − and Madison Gas and Electric Co. became its main subsidiary.

References

External links 
Official MGE Energy website

 
Energy in Wisconsin
Electric power companies of the United States
Natural gas companies of the United States
Companies based in Madison, Wisconsin
Non-renewable resource companies established in 1888
1880s establishments in Wisconsin
Holding companies established in 2001
Non-renewable resource companies established in 2001
2001 establishments in Wisconsin